North Turton is a civil parish of the unitary authority of Blackburn with Darwen in Lancashire, England. According to the United Kingdom Census 2001 the civil parish has a population of 3,736, increasing to 3,867 at the 2011 Census.
North Turton is the northern part of the historic area of Turton.

Geography and administration

Landscape
North Turton is in the West Pennine Moors, between Blackburn in the north and Bolton to the south.

Civic history
North Turton was created in 1974 from the rural part of the former Turton Urban District. Within this civil parish there are three villages, Edgworth, Chapeltown, Belmont, and several hamlets, including Entwistle and Quarlton.

Transport

Roads
There are three main roads that cross North Turton: the A666 (Blackburn Road), the A675 (Belmont Road), and the B6391 (Chapeltown Road).

Railways
There is an infrequent railway commuter service at Entwistle railway station which is served by Northern, which operate services on the Ribble Valley Line. There was a second, Turton and Edgworth railway station but was closed in the 1960s by the Beeching cuts.

See also
Listed buildings in North Turton

References

External links
Welcome to North Turton
North Turton Parish Map
Up to date weather for North Turton, Lancashire
Chairmen of Turton Urban District Council 1873-1974

Geography of Blackburn with Darwen
Local government in Blackburn with Darwen
Civil parishes in Lancashire
West Pennine Moors